Codonosiga elegans is a species of choanoflagellate in the family Codonosigidae. It may be a species complex containing multiple cryptic species – four distinct genotypes are known.

References

External links 
 Codonosiga elegans at AlgaeBase

Craspedida
Species described in 1927